The 2016 iHeartRadio Much Music Video Awards (commonly referred to as the iHeartRadio MMVAs) were held on June 19, 2016 outside 299 Queen Street West in Toronto, Ontario, and hosted by Gigi Hadid.

The 2016 edition was co-branded with iHeartRadio, an online radio service with no Canadian terrestrial presence; earlier in the year, sister division Bell Media Radio had reached a licensing agreement to operate a Canadian version of the service owned by U.S. radio conglomerate iHeartMedia. The co-branding was meant to "further elevate the MMVAs internationally" as part of efforts to bring Bell-owned content into the U.S. via iHeartRadio.

During the broadcast several artists paused to acknowledge the Orlando nightclub shooting that had taken place a week earlier, including singer Nick Jonas who dedicated his award to those involved.

Performances

Presenters 

Amber Rose
Lilly Singh (IISuperwomanII)
SonReal
Hailey Baldwin
Alx Veliz
Sofia Carson
Lucy Hale
Shay Mitchell
Ashley Benson
Nash Grier
Jus Reign
Marianas Trench
Robbie Amell
Scott Helman
Shemar Moore
Tyler Posey
Bethany Mota

Nominees 
The full list of nominees were announced on May 18, 2016.

Video of the Year
Alessia Cara – "Here"
Belly (featuring The Weeknd) – "Might Not"
Drake – "Hotline Bling"
Grimes – "Flesh without Blood"
Shawn Mendes & Camila Cabello – "I Know What You Did Last Summer"

Best Post Production
Kaytranada – "Lite Spots"
Majid Jordan – "Every Step Every Way"
Naturally Born Strangers – "Jameson Ave"
Pup – "Dark Days"
Purity Ring – "Heartsigh"

Best EDM/Dance Video
DVBBS – "White Clouds"
Grandtheft (featuring Lowell) – "Quit This City"
Keys N Krates (featuring Katy B) – "Save Me"
Thugli – "Sic Em"
Zeds Dead (featuring Memorecks) – "Collapse 2.0"

Best Director
Drake – "Hotline Bling" (Director: Director X)
Grimes – "Flesh without Blood" (Director: Claire Boucher)
Majid Jordan – "Something About You" (Director: Common Good)
Kalle Mattson – "Avalanche" (Director: Philip Sportel)
Young Empires – "The Gates" (Director: Amos LeBlanc)

Best Pop Video
Alessia Cara – "Here"
Coleman Hell – "2 Heads"
Hedley – "Lose Control"
Shawn Hook – "Relapse"
Shawn Mendes & Camila Cabello – "I Know What You Did Last Summer"

Best Rock/Alternative Video
City and Colour – "Wasted Love"
Metric – "The Shade"
Monster Truck – "Don't Tell Me How to Live"
The Sheepdogs – "I'm Gonna Be Myself"
The Strumbellas – "Spirits"

Best Hip-Hop Video
Belly (featuring The Weeknd) – "Might Not"
Drake – "Hotline Bling"
Jazz Cartier – "The Valley/Dead or Alive"
John River – "Get Down"
SonReal – "Whoa Nilly"

Best MuchFACT Video
Belly (featuring The Weeknd) – "Might Not"
Humans – "Water Water"
Majid Jordan (featuring Drake) – "My Love"
SonReal – "Whoa Nilly"
Young Empires – "The Gates"

iHeartRadio International Artist of the Year
Adele – "Hello"
James Bay – "Let It Go"
Nick Jonas – "Close"
Rihanna – "Work"
Selena Gomez – "Hands to Myself"
Sia – "Cheap Thrills"
Taylor Swift – "Bad Blood"
Zayn – "Pillowtalk"
Ariana Grande – "Dangerous Woman"
Kanye West – "Only One"

Most Buzzworthy Canadian
Alessia Cara – "Here"
Drake – "Hotline Bling"
Justin Bieber – "What Do You Mean?"
Shawn Mendes – "Stitches"
The Weeknd – "Can't Feel My Face"

Most Buzzworthy International Artist or Group
Adele – "Hello"
Fifth Harmony – "Work from Home"
Hailee Steinfeld – "Rock Bottom"
Macklemore & Ryan Lewis – "Downtown"
Nick Jonas – "Close"
Rihanna – "Work"
Selena Gomez – "Hands to Myself"
Sia – "Cheap Thrills"
Taylor Swift – "Bad Blood"
Zayn – "Pillowtalk"

Best New Canadian Artist
Alessia Cara – "Here"
Coleman Hell – "2 Heads"
Dan Talevski – "Knock Me Off My Feet"
Jazz Cartier – "Wake Me Up When It's Over"
Ria Mae – "Clothes Off"

iHeartRadio International Duo or Group
Coldplay – "Adventure of a Lifetime"
Disclosure – "Magnets"
Fifth Harmony – "Work from Home"
Jack Ü – "Where Are Ü Now"
Macklemore & Ryan Lewis – "Downtown"
Major Lazer – "Powerful"
One Direction – "Drag Me Down"
Tame Impala – "Let It Happen"
The Chainsmokers – "Roses"
Twenty One Pilots – "Stressed Out"

iHeartRadio Canadian Single of the Year
Alessia Cara – "Here"
Coleman Hell – "2 Heads"
Justin Bieber – "Sorry"
Shawn Mendes – "Stitches"
The Weeknd – "Can't Feel My Face"

Fan Fave Video
Alessia Cara – "Here"
Drake – "Hotline Bling"
Shawn Mendes & Camila Cabello – "I Know What You Did Last Summer"
Grimes – "Flesh without Blood"
Hedley – "Lose Control"

Fan Fave Artist or Group
Drake
Justin Bieber
Shawn Mendes
The Weeknd
Alessia Cara

Fan Fave International Artist or Group
Adele
Zayn
Taylor Swift
Macklemore & Ryan Lewis
Fifth Harmony

Fan Fave Vine Musician
Ruth B
Marks Records
Jeffrey Miller
Rajiv Dhall
Kenzie Nimmo

References

External links 

MuchMusic Video Awards
Much Music
2016 in Canadian music
2016 in Canadian television